Ian Rodgerson (born 9 April 1966) is an English former professional association footballer who played as a right-back or midfielder. He played more than 500 games in the lower divisions of the Football League and in the Conference. In all competitions he made more than 100 appearances for Birmingham City, nearly 200 (in two spells) for Cardiff City, and more than 300 for home-town club Hereford United. He went on to qualify as a chartered physiotherapist, going on to work in that capacity for Birmingham City F.C.'s Youth Academy and for Forest Green Rovers F.C. Rodgerson left his position at Forest Green in June 2010. Rodgerson returned to Edgar Street in June 2011 to become the club's new physiotherapist.

References

External links

1966 births
Living people
Sportspeople from Hereford
English footballers
Association football midfielders
Hereford Lads Club F.C. players
Hereford Pegasus F.C. players
Hereford United F.C. players
Cardiff City F.C. players
Birmingham City F.C. players
Sunderland A.F.C. players
English Football League players
National League (English football) players
Alumni of the University of Salford
Hereford United F.C. non-playing staff
Birmingham City F.C. non-playing staff
Forest Green Rovers F.C. non-playing staff 
Cheltenham Town F.C. non-playing staff
20th-century English people